Nagtipunan Agta is a Northeastern Luzon language. It is one of the Aeta languages. The language was discovered by Jason Lobel and Laura Robinson in Nagtipunan, Quirino (Lobel 2013:88). Nagtipunan Agta is most closely related to Casiguran Dumagat Agta.

References

Aeta languages
Northeastern Luzon languages
Languages of Quirino